Salesian Oblates of the Sacred Heart of Jesus (in Italian Salesiane Oblate del Sacro Cuore di Gesù with the abbreviation S.O.S.C.) is an institute of religious sisters of pontifical right of Italian origin founded by Salesian Bishop Mgr. Giuseppe Cognata in 1933 at Bova Marina, Italy. The institute belongs to the Salesian Family.

History 
The institute was founded on December 8, 1933, in Bova Marina by Mgr. Cognata, Bishop of the Dioceses of Bova (1933-1940). It was approved as institute of pontifical right on January 16, 1962, and it was recognized by the Italian state on December 26, 1962. The Holy See gave to it the decree of praise on January 24, 1972; and it formally joined the Salesian family on 24 December 1983.

Activities and expansion 
The Salesian Oblates are dedicated to Christian education of the youth: they have kindergartens, schools, youth centres (oratories) and pastoral centers.

Besides Italy, their original country, they have communities in Bolivia and Peru.

Bibliography 
 Annuario Pontificio per l'anno 2007, Libreria Editrice Vaticana, Città del Vaticano 2007. .
 Guerrino Pelliccia e Giancarlo Rocca (curr.), Dizionario degli Istituti di Perfezione (10 voll.),  Edizioni paoline, Milano 1974–2003.

References

External links 
 

Salesian Order
Religious organizations established in 1933
Catholic female orders and societies
1933 establishments in Italy